Robert Heath (born 31 August 1978) is an English former footballer who played in the Football League for Stoke City.

Career
Heath was born in Newcastle-under-Lyme and began his career with local side Stoke City. He broke into the first team towards the end of the 1997–98 season with Stoke heading for relegation to the third tier. He played twelve times under Brian Little in 1998–99 but struggled to force his way into the side with both Gary Megson and Icelandic Guðjón Þórðarson bringing their own choice of players in 1999–2000 restricting Heath to just five appearances. He played just once in 2000–01 where he scored in a 5–1 victory over York City in the League Cup. He spent the remainder of the season in the reserves and was released in May 2001. He then went on to play for non-league Stafford Rangers.

Career statistics
Source:

References

1978 births
Living people
English footballers
Stoke City F.C. players
Stafford Rangers F.C. players
English Football League players
Sportspeople from Newcastle-under-Lyme
Association football midfielders